Krotovka is a rural locality (a selo) in Konstantinovsky Selsoviet, Kulundinsky District, Altai Krai, Russia. The population was 177 as of 2013. There is 1 street.

Geography 
Krotovka is located 7 km north of Kulunda (the district's administrative centre) by road. Oktyabrsky and Kulunda are the nearest rural localities.

References 

Rural localities in Kulundinsky District